Timpanheck is a village in Annandale, Scottish Borders.

External links

 Timpanheck in The Gazetteer for Scotland
 Geograph.org.uk

Villages in Dumfries and Galloway